Pahlavān Mahmoud, more commonly known as Pouryā-ye Vali (died 1322 CE), was a Persian pahlevani champion and poet. 

The nickname Pouryā-ye Vali has been attributed to Pahlavān Mahmoud in Khwarazm. The location of his tomb is in Khoy of Iran.

He also wrote a book titled Kanz ol-Haghayegh (literally The Treasure of Truths) in Persian. A couplet from him which is sung in Zourkhaneh, is:

افتادگی آموز اگر طالب فیضی
هرگز نخورد آب زمینی که بلند است

Pronunciation:

oftādegi āmooz agar tālebe feyzi, 
hargez nakhorad āb zamini ke boland ast
 
Literal translation:
  
Learn modesty if you desire knowledge, 
A high land would never be irrigated

See also
 Pahlevanan
 Pahlevani and zoorkhaneh rituals

References

Iranian male sport wrestlers
1322 deaths
Year of birth unknown
Iranian folklore
14th-century Iranian people